Mark Harman (born 1951) is an Irish-American translator, most notably of Franz Kafka's work, and professor emeritus at Elizabethtown College, Pennsylvania, United States, where he served as Professor of German & English and College Professor of International Studies.

Life
A native of Dublin, Harman studied at University College Dublin and Yale University, where he took his BA/MA and PhD, respectively. He has taught German and Irish literature at Dartmouth, Oberlin, Franklin & Marshall, and the University of Pennsylvania. He is editor and co-translator of Robert Walser Rediscovered: Stories, Fairy-Tale Plays, and Critical Responses (1985) and translator of Hermann Hesse, Soul of the Age (1991, edited by Theodore Ziolkowski). He is also a freelance translator for many newspapers and scholarly journals.

Harman gained public recognition for his 1998 translation of Franz Kafka's The Castle, for which he won the Lois Roth Award of the Modern Language Association. As a translator, Harman wrote, "Translation is a complex issue, and retranslation doubly so," referencing the double challenge to confront both the text in the original and in other translations. Harman has characterized the current moment as a "great era for retranslation" to reexamine the versions through which generations of English-speakers have encountered important works from other tongues. A detailed discussion of his work with Kafka's unfinished novel may be found at The Castle, Critical Edition, Harman Translation.

His translation of Kafka's "Amerika: The Missing Person", more widely known as Amerika, was published in November 2008.

The New York Review of Books wrote that his translation of Rilke's "Letters to a Young Poet" was "likely to become the standard one".

References

External links
On the retranslation of The Castle
Missing Persons: Two Little Riddles About Kafka and Berlin
Review of The Castle, The New York Times

1951 births
Living people
Alumni of University College Dublin
Yale University alumni
University of Pennsylvania faculty
German–English translators
American translators
Irish emigrants to the United States
Translators of Franz Kafka
Elizabethtown College faculty
20th-century Irish translators